Russell Alton McNutt (May 21, 1914 – February 1, 2008) was an American engineer who allegedly gave information about the Oak Ridge National Laboratory to the Soviet Union. Julius Rosenberg helped recruit him. His code names were “Fogel” and “Persian.” He was never charged or convicted.

References 

Soviet Union–United States relations
Nuclear secrecy
American people in the Venona papers
1914 births
2008 deaths